Leire Baños Indakoetxea (born 29 November 1996) is a Spanish footballer who plays for Levante, mainly as a midfielder.

Club career 
She began her senior career at Oiartzun aged 15, soon being signed by Real Sociedad who added her to their squad immediately – although she was often introduced as a substitute, which occurred in around a quarter of the 200 or so Primera División fixtures she played for the San Sebastián side across eight seasons. She played the entirety of the final and claimed an assist for the winning goal as Erreala claimed their first major honour, the Copa de la Reina in 2018–19, and played an important role in two regional Copa Euskal Herria wins over local rivals Athletic Bilbao in 2019 and 2020.

Having agreed a new contract with Real Sociedad in 2019 to run until 2021, Baños left upon the expiry of that deal and signed for fellow top tier club Levante.

International career 
At international level, Baños was a member of the Spain under-19 squads that finished runners-up in consecutive editions of the UEFA Women's Under-19 Championship (2014 in Norway and 2015 in Israel), featuring in both finals. She has also been selected for the unofficial Basque Country women's national football team which plays only occasionally.

Honors

Club
Real Sociedad
Copa de la Reina: 2018–19

International
Spain U19
UEFA Women's Under-19 Championship Runner-up: 2014, 2015

References

External links
 
Baños at BDFutbol

1996 births
Living people
Sportspeople from Irun
Footballers from the Basque Country (autonomous community)
Spanish women's footballers
Women's association football midfielders
Levante UD Femenino players
Real Sociedad (women) players
Oiartzun KE players
Primera División (women) players
Spain women's youth international footballers
21st-century Spanish women